Mon Jaane Na is a 2019 Indian Bengali language, romantic thriller film directed by Shagufta Rafique and produced by Shrikant Mohata and Mahendra Soni under the banner of SVF. The film starring Yash Dasgupta, Mimi Chakraborty and Rajdeep Gupta follows the love story of Amir and Pari. This is the debut Bengali film of Shagufta Rafique as director. The film was released in theatres on 21 March 2019, coinciding with Holi festival.

Synopsis
Amir (Yash Dasgupta) is a young, lonely man who earns his living through taxi driving. Seeing him alone, his friend advises him to get married. Amir seeks help from the local maulvi who introduces him to a shy, orphan girl, Pari (Mimi Chakraborty). He falls in love with her at first sight and they get married. After marriage, Pari comes across certain secrets of Amir and she goes missing. For two years Amir frantically searches for her throughout the city being a taxi driver. One day he discovers her outside a hotel in an unconscious state. However, Pari is no longer her demure self but has transformed into a reckless drug addict and gone into prostitution.

Cast
 Yash Dasgupta as Amir
 Mimi Chakraborty as Pari
 Shataf Figar as Murad bhai
 Rajdeep Gupta
 Badsha Moitra
 Shankar Chakraborty

Soundtrack

The soundtrack of the film is composed by Dabbu & Lincon while lyrics are written by Prasen.

References

External links
 
 

2019 films
Bengali-language Indian films
2010s Bengali-language films
Indian romantic thriller films
2010s romantic thriller films
2019 romance films
2019 thriller films
Films about contract killing in India
Indian drama films